Palacio is an administrative ward (barrio) of Madrid, Spain belonging to the district of Centro.

It contains the historic neighborhoods of La Latina and El Madrid de los Austrias. 

Wards of Madrid
Centro (Madrid)